
Gmina Złotniki Kujawskie is a rural gmina (administrative district) in Inowrocław County, Kuyavian-Pomeranian Voivodeship, in north-central Poland.

Villages
Gmina Złotniki Kujawskie contains the villages and settlements of Będzitówek, Będzitowo, Będzitowskie Huby, Broniewo, Bronimierz Mały, Bronimierz Wielki, Dąbrówka Kujawska, Dobrogościce, Dźwierzchno, Gniewkówiec, Helenowo, Ignacewo, Jordanowo, Karczówka, Kobelniki, Krążkowo, Krężoły, Leszcze, Lisewo Kościelne, Mierzwin, Niszczewice, Palczyn, Pęchowo, Podgaj, Popowiczki, Rucewko, Rucewo, Tarkowo Górne, Tuczno, Tuczno-Wieś, Tupadły, Złotniczki and Złotniki Kujawskie.

Neighbouring gminas
Gmina Złotniki Kujawskie is bordered by the gminas of Barcin, Inowrocław, Łabiszyn, Nowa Wieś Wielka, Pakość and Rojewo.

References
Polish official population figures 2006

Zlotniki Kujawskie
Inowrocław County